Vélye is a commune in the Marne department in north-eastern France. The inhabitants are called Velytiots in French.

See also
Communes of the Marne department

References

Communes of Marne (department)